The USMLE Step 1 (more commonly just Step 1 or colloquially, The Boards) is the first part of the United States Medical Licensing Examination. It aims to assess whether medical school students or graduates can apply important concepts of the foundational sciences fundamental to the practice of medicine. US medical students who wish to seek licensure to practice medicine in the US typically take Step 1 at the end of the second year of medical school. Graduates of international medical schools (i.e., those outside the US or Canada) must also take Step 1 if they want to practice in the US. Graduates from international medical schools must apply through ECFMG, and the registration fee is $915. For 2020, the NBME registration fee for the test is $645, with additional charges for applicants who choose a testing region outside the United States or Canada.

Prior to January 2022, Step 1 scoring is a three-digit score, theoretically ranging from 1 to 300, with a passing score of 194. It was announced on February 12, 2020 that beginning no earlier than January 2022, USMLE Step 1 would transition to a Pass/Fail scoring system. In July 2020, the USMLE stated that "All scores for Step 1 exams taken prior to the date of the policy change will continue to be reported using the three-digit numeric score on all USMLE transcripts. The USMLE program does not retroactively alter transcripts."

History
Prior to 1992, the NBME Part I examination served as the staple basic science examination for medical students at the end of their second year. Upon the launch of the three-part United States Medical Licensing Examination, NBME Part I exam was carried forward in its new format, the USMLE Step 1 examination, which has since evolved to become an increasingly clinically-applied examination of the foundational sciences. The exam became computer-based several years later. In May 2015, the USMLE began emphasizing concepts regarding patient safety and quality improvement across all parts of the USMLE exam series, including Step 1.

While the USMLE Step 1 has traditionally been taken after students complete foundational sciences and before core clinical clerkships. In recent years, a number of medical schools have reformed their curricula to have students take the USMLE Step 1 after core clinical clerkships or preliminary clinical training. Top medical schools such as Harvard Medical School, University of Colorado School of Medicine, Vanderbilt University School of Medicine, Penn State College of Medicine, UCSF School of Medicine, University of Wisconsin School of Medicine and Public Health, Baylor College of Medicine, Weill Cornell Medical College, Perelman School of Medicine at the University of Pennsylvania, Vagelos College of Physicians and Surgeons at Columbia University, Stanford School of Medicine, University of Michigan, Yale School of Medicine, Roy J. and Lucille A. Carver College of Medicine at the University of Iowa and New York University School of Medicine have instituted these changes, requiring completion of the exam in the third year of medical school.

Format
The exam is currently an eight-hour computer-based test taken in a single-day, composed of seven 60-minute blocks of questions with a maximum of 40 multiple-choice questions per section and 280 for the exam. One hour is provided for each section, allotting an average of a minute and thirty seconds to answer each question. Between test sections, the test taker is allotted a cumulative 45 minutes (during the test day) for personal breaks. (There is a 15-minute tutorial at the beginning of the exam, which the test-taker can choose to skip and have that time added to break time.) If the taker finishes any section before the allotted one-hour time limit, the unused time is added to the break time total. The test is administered at any of several Prometric computer testing sites. Starting in 2022, the USMLE Step I examination will be reported as Pass/Fail rather than a three-digit score.

Subjects
Step 1 is designed to test the knowledge learned during the basic science years of medical school as applied in the form of clinical vignettes. This includes anatomy, behavioral sciences, biochemistry, microbiology, pathology, pharmacology, and physiology, as well as to interdisciplinary areas including genetics, aging, immunology, nutrition, and molecular and cell biology. Epidemiology, medical ethics and questions on empathy are also emphasized. Each exam is dynamically generated for each test taker; while the general proportion of questions derived from a particular subject is the same, some test takers report that certain subjects are either emphasized or deemphasized.

Scoring
Currently, students receive a score of pass or fail following sitting for the Step 1 examination. In 1999, the USMLE phased out the use of a percentile-based system in favor of a three-digit and two-digit scaled scoring system. In October 2011, two-digit scaled scores were no longer reported to any parties besides the examinees. In April 2013, the two-digit score was eliminated completely from the score report.

While the USMLE program does not disclose how the three-digit score is calculated, Step 1 scores theoretically range from 1 to 300, most examinees score in the range of 140 to 260, the passing score is 196, and the national mean and standard deviation are approximately 232 and 19, respectively. Rise in the national mean Step 1 score has been observed with time, as shown in the table below. According to the National Resident Matching Program, the mean score for U.S. allopathic seniors who matched to residency programs in 2016 was 233.2 (SD=17.4).

In 1994, the average Step 1 score for applicants was 200, whereas, in 2018, the average score was 230. In 2021, a score of 200 would place the test taker in the 9th percentile, whereas a 230 in 1994 would have put the test taker in the 93rd percentile. The USMLE scoring scale was originally set to have a mean score of 200 with a standard deviation of 20. The scale has never been re-centered, so a score of 200 in 1994 reflects the same number of questions answered correctly as a score of 200 in 2021.

It was announced on February 12, 2020 that beginning no earlier than January 2022, USMLE Step 1 would transition to a Pass/Fail scoring system. Mean and median USMLE scores have increased significantly from 2003 to today leading to the testing board having to increase the score it takes to pass; independent research cited that practice-question usage was self-reported as a completion fraction of UWorld, USMLE-Rx, or Kaplan question banks or self-assessments.

The USMLE has decided that three-digit score results for Step 1 exams taken prior to January 26, 2022, will "continue to be reported using the three-digit numeric score on all USMLE transcripts."

Changes to Step 1 scoring
It was announced on February 12, 2020 that beginning no earlier than January 2022, USMLE Step 1 would transition to a Pass/Fail scoring system. In July 2020, the USMLE stated that "All scores for Step 1 exams taken prior to the date of the policy change will continue to be reported using the three-digit numeric score on all USMLE transcripts. The USMLE program does not retroactively alter transcripts."

While the NBME, USMLE, and FSMB were originally against these changes (which critics argued may have been from potential monetary loss), as of 2020 (and after the formation of InCUS), they have changed their stance in support of the public opinion. Humayun Chaudhry, the President of the FSMB, (who was originally in opposition to the Step changes), later said that “although the primary purpose of the exam is to assess the knowledge and skills essential to safe patient care, the new policies will “address concerns about Step 1 scores impacting student well-being and medical education.” Because students put so much emphasis on getting a high USMLE Step 1 score, they often skimmed the medical school curriculum that they deemed to be not as relevant in order to get the maximum score on the USMLE Step 1.

Use of Step 1 scores by residency programs
The medical community has criticized the USMLE and residency programs for using Step 1 scores as the main screening tool in selecting applicants for a residency interview, creating a "barrier that was never meant to exist." Residency directors are “overweighting a screening test in a manner not supported by evidence and for which the test was not specifically designed. Step 1 was designed as a  Pass/Fail exam, and beyond the  Pass/Fail designation, the scores were not meant to have meaning. Residency program directors utilize the scores as a means of filtering the significant applications down to a more manageable number that allows for a more thorough review of the remaining applications. A significant amount of residency program directors believe that the conversion to Pass/Fail will make "applicant screening more arduous."

For state licensing purposes, the exam always has been  Pass/Fail, but over the past few years, its three-digit numeric score has been used as the main determination in granting medical interviews. In recent years, an applicant's Step 1 score has been cited by residency program directors as their most important criterion in selecting graduating medical students for their residency program, despite lack of evidence or data to support that practice. Average USMLE Step 1 scores for various residencies are available in Charting Outcomes in the Match.

Studies on Step 1 performance found that "Step 1 is neither precise nor does it predict student performance as residents beyond a certain threshold. With a standard error of eight points, two applicants with scores as far as 15 points apart may not be meaningfully different and yet several programs use singular cutoff points as screening tools." This, as well as the negative impact on student learning, cost, gross misuse of student time, and attempt to decrease racial bias, are amongst the many reasons that the USMLE announced it would revert to Pass/Fail reporting of Step 1 beginning 2022.

Unintended consequences
In a 2017 study, students started studying for Step 1 during their preclinical curriculum and increased the intensity of their study time until it reached 16 hours a day over a period of 4-6 weeks before the exam in a period referred to by medical students as "dedicated". Instead of relying on their medical school curriculum, the students instead focused heavily on third-party study materials. According to Kristen Moon, "While this “parallel curriculum” did lead to an increased Step 1 score, it often did not help them learn the medical school curriculum, because students were skipping lectures and classes."

Racial disparity in score outcomes
Since 2001, there has been a strong plea to remove the Step 1 score barrier that disproportionately affects select racial and ethnic groups. "Using Step 1 scores to screen residency applications puts students who are underrepresented in medicine at a disadvantage." Black and Latino students receive markedly lower scores on Step 1 than white students. The mean USMLE step 1 score was significantly greater among white applicants (223) as compared to black and Hispanic applicants (216). Depending on the threshold score, an African American was 3-6x less likely to be offered an interview.

A 2001 study in internal medicine residency showed that "when Step 1 scores were used to screen applicants for interviews, a significantly greater proportion of Black students were refused interviews." A 2019 study on Orthopedic Surgery residency programs (the specialty with the lowest percentage of underrepresented students) showed that between 2005 and 2014, Black and Latino applicants were accepted into residency programs at a significantly lower rate (61%) than white applicants (71%).

Further studies showed a lack of diversity within specialties and that those underrepresented students were more likely to go into specialties that have lower Step 1 cut-offs like Primary Care.

The American Academy of Family Physicians and Association of American Medical Colleges supported changing Step 1 to pass or fail to reduce racial bias. The AAFP wrote that changing Step 1 to Pass/Fail creates a "more equitable student evaluation and residency selection process, as it will reduce the impact of racial and other biases on residency selection. Factors that impact student experience with standardized testing (such as access to test preparation) perpetuate inequities and disparities that impact test performance, but do not predict or capture competency or skills for future physicians." The American Medical Student Association recommended changing scoring to Pass/Fail to reduce the adverse impact of the current overemphasis on USMLE performance in residency screening as well as the associated racial bias. The ECFMG and AMA supported this transition as well.

Support for USMLE changes
According to the NMBE's InCUS survey results, there were mixed responses regarding support for "consideration of changes such as pass/fail scoring categorical/tiered scoring, and composite scoring." Per the survey, those in agreement with changes include 26% of residency program directors, 32% of current or former state board members, 39% of interns, residents, and fellows, 39% of medical school faculty, 44% of medical students, 67% of course directors, and 75% of Associate/Assistant Deans (of medical schools). Notably, medical students and program directors were among parties with only a minority in favor of this change, despite being the most directly affected. Parties associated with medical schools, namely course directors and Deans were noted to have the most support for changes.

The USMLE parent organizations, including the AAFP, AMSA, and AAMC wrote letters to the USMLE recommended broad, systemic changes to the medical program including changing Step 1 to Pass/Fail. "The current overemphasis on USMLE Step 1 is having an overwhelmingly negative impact on students. This should be addressed immediately. A  Pass/Fail score will help provide a more meaningful learning environment, improved emotional climate, and better student-student interactions, which can lead to better academic performance that includes USMLE tests (see Cause or effect?). Additionally, it will decrease racial bias for programs that use USMLE Step 1 scores to grant interviews." Further, they supported the move to Step 1 Pass/Fail citing unintentional negative impact of a single standardized exam on career exploration and selection.

Objection to USMLE changes 
According to the NMBE's InCUS survey results, there were mixed responses regarding support for "consideration of changes such as pass/fail scoring, categorical/tiered scoring, and composite scoring." Per the survey, those in agreement with changes include 26% of residency program directors, 32% of current or former state board members, 39% of interns, residents, and fellows, 39% of medical school faculty, 44% of medical students, 67% of course directors, and 75% of Associate/Assistant Deans (of medical schools). Notably, medical students and program directors were among parties with only a minority in favor of this change, despite being the most directly affected. Parties associated with medical schools, namely course directors and Deans were noted to have the most support for changes.

Immediately following the announcement by USMLE that Step 1 would become  Pass/Fail in 2022, concern has been expressed from several parties in the medical community, namely residency program directors and medical students, both among US graduates and international graduates.

In a survey of nearly 300 residency program directors in surgical fields, program directors were found to significantly disagree with the statements that changing to Pass/Fail "is a good idea" (78.1% [69.9–86.4%] disagree) and the statement that "Step 2 CK should also be changed to Pass/Fail" (84.0% [76.7–91.3%]). They were also found to significantly agree with the statements that changing to Pass/Fail: "Will make it more difficult to objectively compare applicants" (88.3% [81.9–94.7%]), "Will increase emphasis on Step 2 CK scores in selecting applicants for my program" (88.7% [82.5–95.0%]), "Will make applicant screening more arduous" (85.4% [78.4–92.4%]), "I will now require applicants to submit Step 2 CK scores with ERAS" (88.4% [81.7–95.0%]), and "Where an applicant goes to medical school will be more important in screening and selection for my program" (63.5% [53.8–73.2%]).

US medical students have also expressed concern that priority that would have gone to Step 1 score will instead be shifted to school prestige, student connections, clinical grading, Step 2 CK scores, and extracurricular experiences. In particular, students from DO (Doctor of Osteopathic Medicine) and "low tier" MD schools may be at considerable disadvantage compared to students from prestigious schools. This concern is validated by the aforementioned program director survey. These same schools are less likely to provide the same robust extracurricular opportunities, particularly in terms of highly valued research opportunities for these schools.

Step 2 CK is a three-digit-scored exam typically taken after the third year of medical school, which consists of clinical rotations in primary care fields. In February 2020, the Harvard Crimson wrote, "the fact that Step 2 is a more clinically relevant exam than Step 1, makes it a better proxy for clinical acumen." However, the timing of Step 2 CK is often only months before residency applications are submitted, meaning a poor score could jeopardize a student's application without allowing time to change tracks or bolster other application components.

International medical students and graduates expressed growing concerns that the change will further decrease IMG (International Medical Graduates) chances of matching into US residency programs.  Historically, IMGs have been at a significant disadvantage when applying to US residency programs. Outside of scores, residency program directors consider letters of recommendation, clinical grades, and research. Since international medical students come from medical schools with different grading systems and do not usually have access to well-known faculty and American research opportunities, USMLE Step 1 is often seen as a major opportunity to boost IMG residency applications with a high score. Without a numerical score on the USMLE Step 1, there is speculation that IMG's will be further be pushed out of the race for residency program spots. This was supported to some extent by General Surgery program director respondents, which significantly agreed that the changes to Pass/Fail "Will put IMGs at a disadvantage" 56.0% [48.6–63.4%].

Formation of InCUS and Outcomes
The current use of Step 1 scoring as a major determinant for granting residency interviews has been met with tremendous criticism by the medical community. The public outcry led to the formation of a committee and investigation in early 2019 called the Invitational Conference on USMLE Scoring (InCUS). The USMLE published a list of InCUS participants. In February 2020, InCUS concluded that residencies were overemphasizing Step 1 and not using it for its original purpose for which it was designed as a means of licensing.

Upon reaching these conclusions, the USMLE program announced a plan to change Step 1 score reporting to a  Pass/Fail system in an effort "to reduce overemphasis on Step 1 performance while allowing licensing authorities to use the exam for its primary purpose of medical licensure eligibility." The USMLE stated that transition will occur no earlier than January 1, 2022.

In July 2020, the USMLE stated that "All scores for Step 1 exams taken prior to the date of the policy change will continue to be reported using the three-digit numeric score on all USMLE transcripts. The USMLE program does not retroactively alter transcripts."

Effect on residency matching

The USMLE score is one of many factors considered by residency programs in selecting applicants. 

Many residency programs used a "cutoff" score for Step 1, below which applicants were unlikely to be considered. The NRMP Residency Program Director survey contains more information, both overall and by specialty, regarding "cutoff" scores (i.e., scores below which programs generally do not grant interviews).

Studies on Step 1 performance found that "Step 1 is neither precise nor does it predict student performance as residents beyond a certain threshold. With a standard error of eight points, two applicants with scores as far as 15 points apart may not be meaningfully different and yet several programs use singular cutoff points as screening tools." This, as well as the impact on student learning, cost of preparation, diversion of student time toward exam preparation, and desire to decrease racial bias, are amongst the reasons that the USMLE switched to Pass/Fail reporting of Step 1 at the beginning of 2022.

Controversies

Converting to Pass/Fail Scoring
See Support for USMLE changes and Objection to USMLE changes in Changes to Step 1 scoring.

USMLE response to COVID-19
During the COVID-19 pandemic, the USMLE and NBME were met with criticism from some members of the medical community, including the American Medical Association (AMA), for miscommunication, delays and lack of flexibility during the COVID-19 global pandemic. They were also criticized for reducing the length of the exam at newly established testing centers in some U.S. medical schools to be able to accommodate more students for testing as those changes would diminish the standardization of the tests. There were concerns that these issues would lead to many applicants having incomplete applications during the 2021 match season which would then negatively affect the ability of program directors to effectively evaluate candidates. Prometric eventually added testing sites at some medical schools and re-opened testing centers with new safety protocols. USMLE also reverted the announced changes to the exams length. To accommodate these changes, the Electronic Residency Application Service (ERAS) adjusted the application timeline to allow students an additional month to submit their applications.

Experimental Questions 
On June 4, 2020, the USMLE announced a plan to administer tests at medical schools throughout the nation, but that these exams would notably lack experimental questions, while exams administered at testing centers during the same time period would still have these experimental questions. These experimental questions accounted for 80 of the 280 on the exam, which would have led to the decreasing the total test taking time from 7–8 hours to 5–6 hours. Some commenters expressed concerns since this practice would have "destandardized" the text and test-takers would have been "experimented" on without consent.  The USMLE ultimately reverted the announced changes to the exams length,.

Katsufrakis & Chaudhry comments on Step 1 changes 
In December 2018, NBME President Peter Katsufrakis and FSMB President Humayun Chaudhry wrote in opposition of USMLE Step 1 changes in from Improving Residency Selection Requires Close Study and Better Understanding of Stakeholder Needs: "If students reduce time and effort devoted to preparing for Step 1, they may indeed devote attention to other activities that will prepare them to be good physicians. This would arguably be an ideal outcome of such a change. However, if students were to devote more time to activities that make them less prepared to provide quality care, such as binge-watching the most recent Netflix series or compulsively updating their Instagram account, this could negatively impact residency performance and ultimately patient safety. We know that assessment drives learning, so another concern resulting from a shift to pass/fail scoring may be a less knowledgeable physician population." This was met with significant backlash from students and the medical education community as this was felt to be a "tone-deaf assumption that medical trainees with more time may instead redirect their effort toward Netflix and Instagram."

Within a few days, Katsufrakis and Chaudhry issued an apology and removed the phrase.

Exam Pricing and NBME Executive Salaries 
NBME and USMLE were met with criticism when they announced their raising cost for Step standardized tests. Kevin MD wrote, "Safeguards are needed to ensure fees for mandatory testing such as the USMLE do not exceed reasonable operating costs, particularly for financially vulnerable medical students." Registering for Step exams test cost between $645 and $985. 

The NBME executives received public criticism related to their increasing salaries. 
"Former NBME President Dr. Melnick's compensation increased from $399,160 in 2001 to over $1.2 million in 2016, almost in parallel with the tripling of USMLE costs." "According to the 2017 Form 990, Schedule J, two lower executives received total compensation over $700,000; another two over $600,000; another three receiving over $500,000, and another 6 receiving over $400,000."

See also 
 USMLE Step 2CK
 USMLE Step 2CS
 USMLE Step 3
National Board of Medical Examiners
United States Medical Licensing Examination

References

External links
USMLE Official Website

Medical education in the United States
Standardized tests in healthcare education
United States Medical Licensing Examination